The 36th edition of the annual Hypo-Meeting took place on May 29 and May 30, 2010 in Götzis, Austria. The track and field competition, featuring a men's decathlon and a women's heptathlon event was part of the 2010 IAAF World Combined Events Challenge. Oleksiy Kasyanov and Jessica Ennis led the men's and women's competition, respectively, after the first day. Ennis (6689 points) and Bryan Clay (8483 points) were the winners of the events overall.

Men's Decathlon

Schedule

May 29 

May 30

Records

Results

Women's heptathlon

Schedule

May 29 

May 30

Records

Results

See also
2010 Decathlon Year Ranking

References

Results
 Official results by IAAF
 
 
 decathlon2000

2010
Hypo-Meeting
Hypo-Meeting